(born 8 October 2001) is a Japanese professional golfer. She plays on the LPGA of Japan Tour where she won three of the first five tournaments of the 2022 season.

Career
Saigo was born in Funabashi in Greater Tokyo and won the Japan Women's Amateur Championship in 2019.

She turned professional and joined the LPGA of Japan Tour in 2020. In 2021, she was runner-up seven times to finish 4th on the 2020–21 money list.

In the 2022 season, she recorded three wins and two second place finishes in the first six tournaments, after which she rose to 18th in the Women's World Golf Rankings.

Saigo has endorsement deals with Mizuno Golf, Shimadzu, Fila & GS Yuasa

Amateur wins
2019 Japan Women's Amateur Championship

Professional wins

LPGA of Japan Tour wins (5)

^Tournament shortened due to adverse conditions.

References

External links
 
 
 

Japanese female golfers
LPGA of Japan Tour golfers
People from Funabashi
Sportspeople from Chiba Prefecture
2001 births
Living people
21st-century Japanese women